The Tripod Complex Fire was a wildfire which burned in north-central Washington state in 2006. The complex consisted of two wildfire complexes which later merged into a single fire: the Spur Peak Fire and the Tripod Fire. Both were caused by lightning strikes.

Events

Prolonged hot and dry weather, combined with an outbreak of mountain pine beetles and a large number of thunderstorms made the 2006 wildfire season of the most severe in Washington state history. The 2006 Pacific Northwest wildfire season began in late June, when an extended thunderstorm followed a three-day heat wave. Between June 27 and July 10, lightning strikes occurred almost daily.

Lightning ignited several wildfires during this period—including the Spur Peak Fire, which was first reported on July 3. Located in the Okanogan National Forest, the fire was deemed fully contained by July 14.

A second thunderstorm in late July set off another round of wildfire activity in the region. On July 24, a new fire burning just south of the Spur Peak Fire was reported: the Tripod Fire. Smokejumpers from the North Cascades Smokejumpers base in nearby Winthrop, Washington— from the point of ignition—were quickly dispatched to the fire. Despite early containment efforts, low humidity and gusty winds allowed the Tripod Fire to grow rapidly. The extreme fire weather also re-intensified the previously contained Spur Peak Fire, which crossed control lines on July 27. The two fires converged in late August.

In mid-August, a battalion of 550 United States Army soldiers were deployed to fight the Tripod Complex Fire. It was the first time a military battalion had been used to fight a wildfire in the US since 2003. Washington governor Christine Gregoire surveyed the complex by helicopter and later declared a statewide wildfire emergency, stating "numerous wildfires across Washington pose a serious threat to homes, infrastructure, businesses and natural resources".

The Tripod Complex was extinguished in October, when snowfall ended the wildfire season.

References

2006 in Washington (state)
2006 wildfires in the United States
Okanogan County, Washington
Okanogan National Forest
Wildfires in Washington (state)